Morgan Guilavogui (born 10 March 1998) is a professional footballer who plays as a midfielder for Ligue 2 club Paris FC. Born in France, he plays for the Guinea national team.

Early life
Guilavogui was born in Ollioules, France, to Guinean father and Maroccan mother. His father was from Macenta, Nzérékoré Region.

Club career
On 17 May 2020, Guilavogui signed a professional contract with Paris FC. He made his professional debut with the club in a 2–1 Ligue 2 win over Amiens on 12 September 2020.

International career
Born in France, Guilavogui is of Guinean descent. He debuted with the Guinea national team in a 0–0 2022 FIFA World Cup qualification tie against Guinea Bissau on 12 November 2021.

Personal life
Guilavogui is the brother of the French international footballer Josuha Guilavogui.

Career statistics

Club

References

External links
 
 Paris FC Profile
 
 Anciens Verts Profile

1998 births
Living people
People from Ollioules
Citizens of Guinea through descent
Guinean footballers
Guinea international footballers
French footballers
French sportspeople of Guinean descent
Association football midfielders
AS Saint-Étienne players
Paris FC players
SC Toulon players
Ligue 2 players
Championnat National 2 players
Championnat National 3 players
2021 Africa Cup of Nations players
Sportspeople from Var (department)
Footballers from Provence-Alpes-Côte d'Azur
Black French sportspeople